Lok Parlok  is a 1979 Indian Hindi-language fantasy comedy film, produced by S. Venkataratnam under the Sree Pallavi Productions banner and directed by T. Rama Rao. The film stars Jeetendra and Jaya Prada, with music composed by Laxmikant–Pyarelal. It is a remake of the Telugu film Yamagola (1977). Both films are made by same banner and director. The film was an average venture at the box office.

Plot 
Amar lives a poor lifestyle along with his widowed mom in a village and has a sweetheart in Savitri. He is a trouble-maker and makes life difficult for the Panchayat Chair, Kalicharan, who also happens to be Savitri's father, so much so that Kalicharan hires Ram Shastri to kill Amar. After his passing, Amar enters Swarg Lok where he gets to meet with Devraj Indra and then Yamraj. Amar incites Yam Dhooths to go on a strike, as well as has Yamraj himself consider going on a vacation along with his assistant, Chitragupt Sharma. As a result, Yamraj and Chitragupt end up in modern-day Bombay as ordinary human beings, and people stop dying, while Amar himself is given back his life. But not for long, for soon he will be called upon to provide bail for a jailed Yamraj and Chitragupt, who will soon return to Swarg Lok and take him along too!!

Cast 

Jeetendra as Amar / Ram Ghulam
Jaya Prada as Savitri
Amjad Khan as Ram Shastri / Boston Strangler / Raman Raghav
Madan Puri as Kalicharan
Pradeep Kumar as Devraj Indra
Premnath as Yamraj
Deven Verma as Chitragupt Sharma
Padma Khanna as Menaka
Agha as Traffic Constable
Rajan Haksar as Gopi
Roopesh Kumar as Manager, Punjab Darbar Hotel
Sunder as Rude car driver
N. Salim Khan
Tun Tun as Sundari
Pandaribai
Vijayalalitha
 Aparna
Vijaya Bhanu
Manju Bhargavi
Jayamalini as Courtesan

Soundtrack 
The songs were composed by Laxmikant–Pyarelal and songs written by Anand Bakshi.

References

External links 
 

1970s fantasy comedy films
1970s Hindi-language films
1979 comedy films
1979 films
Films directed by T. Rama Rao
Films scored by Laxmikant–Pyarelal
Hindi remakes of Telugu films
Indian fantasy comedy films
Yama in popular culture